Rannu Parish was a rural municipality in Tartu County, Estonia. In 2017 it was merged into Elva Parish.

Settlements
Small boroughs
Kureküla
- Rannu

Villages
Ervu
- Järveküla
- Kaarlijärve
- Kipastu
- Koopsi
- Kulli
- Neemisküla
- Noorma
- Paju
- Sangla
- Suure-Rakke
- Tamme
- Utukolga
- Vallapalu
- Vehendi
- Verevi
- Väike-Rakke

Gallery

References

External links

 

Municipalities of Estonia
Populated places in Tartu County